Christoffer Heidemann (1623-1703) was a Dano-Norwegian government official.  He served as the County Governor of Nordland county from 1694 until his death in 1703.

References

1623 births
1703 deaths
County governors of Norway
County governors of Nordland